{ "type": "ExternalData", "service": "geoshape", "ids": "Q1375426", "properties": { "fill": "#73a3f0"}}

Parengarenga Harbour is a natural harbour close to the northernmost point on the North Island of New Zealand. Located at the northern end of the Aupouri Peninsula, it extends inland for over 10 kilometres, almost severing the northern tip of the island from the rest of the peninsula. The harbour's mouth is towards the northern end of Great Exhibition Bay. The island's northernmost point, at the Surville Cliffs is only about 10 kilometres north of the harbour. Te Hāpua is a settlement at the western side of the harbour.

History 

The harbour was an important location for the kauri gum digging trade in the latter 19th and early 20th centuries, as some of the highest quality kauri gum could be found around the harbour. The Parenga Gumfield Company was formed to harvest this resource.

The white sand of Kokota Sandspit, at the southern head of Parengarenga Harbour, has provided a source of high purity silica sand for glassmaking. Dredging continued here until 1997. While smaller or lower purity deposits are found elsewhere in Northland, the Parengarenga area holds the region's largest silica sand resource by far.

Samuel Yates and his wife, Ngāwini Yates, were prominent landowners in the area in the later part of the 19th century and had a homestead on the southern side of the harbour, at Paua.

Ecology 

The water is a habitat for Green sea turtles, and dolphins, Killer whales, and Pilot whales visit the adjacent areas.

Gallery

References

Far North District
Geography of the Northland Region
Ports and harbours of New Zealand
Kauri gum